José Leandro Andrade (22 November 1901 – 5 October 1957) was an Uruguayan footballer who played at wing-half. He was nicknamed "The Black Marvel" (maravilla negra). During his prime he was regarded as one of the finest footballers in the world, contributing to the Uruguay national football team's domination of international football during the 1920s, winning two consecutive Olympic Gold Medals and then the first FIFA World Cup.

Early life

Andrade was born in Salto in 1901 to an Argentine mother. José Ignacio Andrade, who is believed to have been his father, was listed on his birth certificate as a witness. The older Andrade, who was 98 years old at the time of José Leandro Andrade's birth, had been an expert in African magic and is believed to have been an African-born slave who had escaped from Brazil.

At an early age Andrade moved to the Palermo barrio in Montevideo where he lived with an aunt.

Prior to the introduction of professional football in Uruguay he worked in a number of jobs. He at one time worked as a carnival musician playing the drums, violin and the tambourine, and at another time led the drums corp for carnival comparsa Libertadores de Africa. At various times in his life he also worked as a shoeshiner and as a newspaper salesman.

Playing career

Club career
As a teenager Andrade played for Montevideo club Misiones.

In the early 1920s Andrade was signed by Bella Vista, where he played 71 matches and scored seven goals. It was at Bella Vista that he was first selected for the national team.

Andrade later moved to Nacional where he won four Uruguayan Championships and three national cups.

Andrade transferred to Peñarol in 1930 where he played 88 matches over the next few years. He had trained with Peñarol as a teenager but had not been accepted.

From the mid-1930s he played for a number of teams in Argentina including Atlanta, and Lanús-Talleres. He also had a brief stint with Wanderers in Uruguay.

International career
Andrade earned 34 appearances with la Celeste Olimpica scoring one goal between 1923 and 1930.

South American Championship
Andrade played in South American Championship (now known as Copa América) winning teams in 1923, 1924 and 1926.

1924 Olympics
Andrade won his first Olympic gold medal at the 1924 Olympic football tournament in Paris. He was recognised as being the first black international football player to play Olympic football. He was nicknamed The Black Marvel and The Black Pearl, the latter a name later used in reference to Pelé.

In reaction to the 1924 Olympic win the Uruguayan team were challenged to a two match series by Argentina. In the second match at the Estadio Sportivo Barracas in Buenos Aires Andrade was pelted with stones by the Argentine crowd to which Andrade and the rest of the Uruguayan team responded by throwing the stones back. In the ensuing riot a member of his team was arrested and the Uruguayans refused to play out the remainder of the match.

1928 Olympics
In 1928 he won his second Olympic gold medal at the 1928 Olympics in Amsterdam. During the semi-final match against Italy Andrade collided with a goal post, seriously injuring an eye. This later deteriorated to the point that he became blind in that eye.

1930 FIFA World Cup
Despite not being at his peak he managed to be one of Uruguay's best players as they won the 1930 World Cup. At the end of the tournament he was selected in the All-Star team. In 1994, he was selected by France Football as number ten in their World Cup Top-100.

A plaque was placed at the Estadio Centenario in honour of his achievements.

Playing style
Andrade was also credited with being an intelligent and honest player who never celebrated his goals. He was a dynamic, fast and highly technical player who was able to dominate the pitch without the physicality of many of his teammates.

Later life
After touring nine European countries with Andrade's Uruguayan club side Nacional, in 1925, they attracted a total of over 800,000 spectators. Andrade played half of that tour when he was told by a doctor in Brussels that he had contracted syphilis. He disappeared to Paris upon hearing the news. Andrade did not return to Montevideo until two months later; there a reporter said he had lost weight and seemed in a state of depression. He then underwent a course of treatment. Andrade had lost some pace but none of his skill and went on to secure international titles for Uruguay. It was said that he had gone blind in one eye after a semi-final against Italy, Andrade had run into a goalpost and it was speculated that the injury was so serious he was later blinded in one eye. Others said his blindness and deteriorated health was caused by syphilis.

Andrade was a guest at the 1950 FIFA World Cup when Uruguay won their second world championship. His nephew Víctor Rodríguez Andrade, a member of the 1950 team, had adopted Andrade as his second surname in honour of Andrade. In 1956 German journalist Fritz Hack searched Montevideo for Andrade for six days. He found him living in terrible conditions in a basement of a flat. Andrade was too intoxicated to understand Hack's questions. Within a year, Andrade died, penniless and alcoholic, in an asylum in Montevideo at age 55.

Honours

Club
Nacional
Primera División Uruguaya
Winner: 1924
Runner-up: 1929
Peñarol
Primera División Uruguaya
Winner: 1932, 1935
Runner-up: 1933, 1934

International
Uruguay
Olympic Games
Gold medal: 1924, 1928
FIFA World Cup
Winner: 1930
South American Championship
Winner: 1923, 1924, 1926
Runner-up: 1927

Individual
IFFHS Football Player of the Century: 69th
South American Championship: Best Player 1926
FIFA World Cup: Bronze Ball 1930
FIFA World Cup: All-Star Team 1930
France Football's World Cup Top-100 1930–1990: 10th

References

External links

1901 births
1957 deaths
Footballers from Salto, Uruguay
Uruguayan footballers
Uruguay international footballers
Afro-Uruguayan
Uruguayan people of Argentine descent
Sportspeople of Argentine descent
Uruguayan people of Brazilian descent
Sportspeople of Brazilian descent
Uruguayan Primera División players
Club Nacional de Football players
C.A. Bella Vista players
Peñarol players
Montevideo Wanderers F.C. players
Argentinos Juniors footballers
1930 FIFA World Cup players
Talleres de Remedios de Escalada footballers
Club Atlético Atlanta footballers
Association football midfielders
Olympic footballers of Uruguay
Footballers at the 1924 Summer Olympics
Footballers at the 1928 Summer Olympics
Olympic gold medalists for Uruguay
Medalists at the 1924 Summer Olympics
Medalists at the 1928 Summer Olympics
FIFA World Cup-winning players
Olympic medalists in football
Copa América-winning players